A genderless language is a natural or constructed language that has no distinctions of grammatical gender—that is, no categories requiring morphological agreement for gender between nouns and associated pronouns, adjectives, articles, or verbs.

The notion of a "genderless language" is distinct from that of gender-neutral language, which is neutral with regard to natural gender. A discourse in a genderless language need not be gender-neutral (although genderless languages exclude many possibilities for reinforcement of gender-related stereotypes); similarly, a gender-neutral discourse need not take place in a genderless language.

Genderless languages do have various means to recognize natural gender, such as gender-specific words (mother, son, etc., and distinct pronouns such as he and she in some cases), as well as gender-specific context, both biological and cultural.

Genderless languages are listed at list of languages by type of grammatical genders. Genderless languages include all the Kartvelian languages (including Georgian), some Indo-European languages (such as Bengali, Persian and Armenian), Dravidian languages (such as Kannada and Tamil), all the Uralic languages (such as Hungarian, Finnish and Estonian), all the modern Turkic languages (such as Turkish, Tatar, and Kazakh), Chinese, Japanese, Korean, most Austronesian languages (such as the Polynesian languages), and Vietnamese.

Language contact

Morphological view 
From the morphological point of view, grammatical gender may arise because of language contact. Surveys of gender systems in 256 languages around the world show that 112 (44%) have grammatical gender and 144 (56%) are genderless. Since these two types of languages in many cases are geographically close to each other, there is a significant chance that one influences the other. For example, the Basque language is considered a genderless language, but it has been influenced by the Spanish feminine-masculine two-gender system. There are 6909 recognized languages in the world, thus a sample of 256 languages constitutes roughly 3.7% of all spoken languages. Thus, although this particular survey indicates a high proportion of gender neutrality, it does not take into account the other 96.3% of languages.

Loaned from other languages 
Gender has been associated with words, but not with ideas. Scholars are trying to study the development of gender in nouns that have been borrowed from other languages. One example is the gender assignment of the genderless English nouns that were borrowed into the Italian spoken by immigrants to America. The phonological form of the loaned word sometimes determines its gender. For example, Italians who immigrated to America do not identify the word freezer, but instead heard freezə (with a schwa). This sound is similar to /a/, so the word becomes frisa. Consequently, the new word ends in /a/ which is feminine. The same happens with the words water (la vuora), the sweater (la suera), and the quarter (la quora). This process happens also in American-German and American-French. The English termination -ing (in gerund forms) sounds somewhat like French -ine and has a similar function to the German -ung, both of which are feminine suffixes. In this case, the genderless nouns do not generate one gender or another. In the American-Italian dialect, the masculine is the default gender, as in Spanish, Portuguese, French, Norwegian, and Old English.

Specific languages

While English, unlike Old English, is gender-free grammatically, it does have natural gender, which is a semantic concept. The distinctions of natural gender still remain in pronouns and possessive adjectives: he, him, his; she, her, hers, although these do not entirely follow natural gender, e.g. the feminine gender is used for ships and the neuter gender is often used for animals. 

Some Indo-European languages, such as Bengali and Persian, altogether lack both grammatical and natural gender.

See also
Gender neutrality in genderless languages
Gender neutrality in languages with grammatical gender
Grammatical gender
Gender-neutral pronoun
Lavender linguistics

References

Languages by typology
Gender-neutral language
Grammatical gender